Ioplaca is a genus of crustose lichens in the family Teloschistaceae. The genus was circumscribed in 1977 by Czech lichenologist Josef Poelt with Ioplaca sphalera assigned as the type species.

Species
Ioplaca pindarensis 
Ioplaca rinodinoides 
Ioplaca sphalera

References

Teloschistales
Lichen genera
Teloschistales genera
Taxa described in 1977
Taxa named by Josef Poelt